Slussen is a station of the Stockholm metro, located in Slussenområdet in the district of Södermalm. The station is served by the Red and Green lines. Originally opened in 1933 as an underground tram stop, on 1 October 1950 it became the terminal of the first metro line running south to Hökarängen, it was again rebuilt when the extension of the line north to Hötorget was opened on 24 November 1957. On 5 April 1964, the first stretch of the Red line, between T-Centralen and Fruängen, was opened.

Just outside the northern entrance to the metro station, there is a bus terminal for buses to the Nacka and Värmdö municipalities. The terminus for the Saltsjöbanan railway was also located here, but it was moved to Henriksdal in 2016 due to the reconstruction of Slussen. Traffic will resume when the reconstruction is complete, possibly in 2026.

In November 2017 an art exhibition by Liv Strömquist at the metro station sparked a debate about the appropriateness of showing depictions of menstruation to children.

References

External links
Images of Slussen

Green line (Stockholm metro) stations
Red line (Stockholm metro) stations
Railway stations opened in 1933
Railway stations opened in 1950
1933 establishments in Sweden
1950 establishments in Sweden